The 1962 Vuelta a España was the 17th Vuelta a España, taking place from 27 April to 13 May 1962.

Jacques Anquetil started the race with the intention of winning it and becoming the first cyclist to win all the three grand tours. However, injury forced him out of the race. His Saint-Raphaël–Helyett team dominated the race, with the team taking the leaders jersey after the second stage of the race. Rudi Altig and Seamus Elliott both wore the jersey with Altig taking it off the shoulders of Elliott after winning the final individual time trial on the 15th stage. Altig became the first German winner of the event.

Teams and riders

Route

Classification leadership

Results

References

 
1962
1962 in road cycling
1962 in Spanish sport
1962 Super Prestige Pernod